Mary, Princess Royal and Countess of Harewood (Victoria Alexandra Alice Mary; 25 April 1897 – 28 March 1965), was a member of the British royal family. She was the only daughter of King George V and Queen Mary, the sister of kings Edward VIII and George VI, and aunt of Elizabeth II. In the First World War, she performed charity work in support of servicemen and their families. She married Henry Lascelles, Viscount Lascelles (later the 6th Earl of Harewood), in 1922. Mary was given the title of Princess Royal in 1932. During the Second World War, she was Controller Commandant of the Auxiliary Territorial Service. The Princess Royal and the Earl of Harewood had two sons, George Lascelles, 7th Earl of Harewood, and The Honourable Gerald Lascelles.

Early life and education

Princess Mary was born on 25 April 1897 at York Cottage on the Sandringham Estate in Norfolk, during the reign of her great-grandmother Queen Victoria. She was the third child and only daughter of the Duke and Duchess of York. Her father was the only surviving son of the Prince and Princess of Wales, while her mother was the eldest child and only daughter of the Duke and Duchess of Teck. She was named Victoria Alexandra Alice Mary, after her paternal great-grandmother Queen Victoria; her paternal grandmother, Alexandra, Princess of Wales; her maternal grandmother, Mary Adelaide, Duchess of Teck; and her great-aunt, Alice, Grand Duchess of Hesse and by Rhine, with whom she shared a birthday. She was known by the last of her Christian names, Mary. She was fifth in the line of succession at the time of her birth, superseded by her younger brothers, Prince Henry, Prince George, and Prince John.

She was baptised at St Mary Magdalene's Church near Sandringham on 7 June 1897 by William Dalrymple Maclagan, Archbishop of York. Her godparents were: the Queen (her great-grandmother); the King of the Hellenes (her paternal great-uncle); the Dowager Empress of Russia (her paternal great-aunt); the Prince and Princess of Wales (her paternal grandparents); the Duchess of Teck (her maternal grandmother); Princess Victoria of Wales (her paternal aunt); and Prince Francis of Teck (her maternal uncle). Her grandfather King Edward VII ascended to the throne in 1901 when Mary was three years old.

Princess Mary was educated by governesses, but shared some lessons with her brothers, Prince Edward, Prince Albert, and Prince Henry. She became fluent in German and French, and developed a lifelong interest in horses and horse racing. Her first state appearance was at the coronation  of her parents, King George V and Queen Mary at Westminster Abbey on 22 June 1911.

Charity work
During World War I, Princess Mary visited hospitals and welfare organisations with her mother; assisting with projects to give comfort to British servicemen and assistance to their families.
She took an active role in promoting the Girl Guide movement, the VADs, and the Land Girls. In June 1918, following an announcement in The Gentlewoman, she began a nursing course at Great Ormond Street Hospital, working two days a week in the Alexandra Ward.  

On 20 November 1918, Princess Mary became the first member of the royal family to visit France following the Armistice. She visited centres associated with Queen Alexandra's Royal Army Nursing Corps or Voluntary Aid Detachment Units, and hospitals with wounded soldiers.

Princess Mary's public duties reflected her concerns with nursing, the Girl Guide movement, and the Women's Services.
In the period leading up to her marriage, girls and women in the British Empire named Mary or its variants (including Marie, May and Miriam) banded together to form "The Marys of the Empire," and donated money toward a wedding present. She presented this fund to the Girl Guides Association for the purchase of the estate of Foxlease, and following the exhibition of her wedding presents, she also contributed half the proceeds to the same cause, for upkeep, a total of £10,000, which enabled the project to go ahead.

She became honorary president of the British Girl Guide Association in 1920, a position she held until her death. She received the Silver Fish Award, Girl Guiding's highest adult honour, in recognition of her contribution to the movement. It was reported in July 2013 that British Pathé had discovered newsreel film from 1927 in which the ancestors of Catherine Middleton are, as Lord Mayors of Leeds, playing host to Princess Mary at the Young Women's Christian Association in Hunslet, Leeds; both Sir Charles Lupton and his brother Hugh Lupton, were the uncles of Olive Middleton, the Princess of Wales's great grandmother. In 1921, the Princess became the first patron of the Not Forgotten Association, a position she held until her death in 1965. The charity's first Christmas Tea Party was organised by Mary and held at St James's Palace in 1921 when she invited 600 wounded servicemen for afternoon tea and the event has been held annually ever since. In 1926, Princess Mary became the commandant-in-chief of the British Red Cross Detachments.

In the 1920s, she was a patron of the Leeds Triennial Musical Festival. By the 1940s, Princess Mary was attending the opening nights and many of the festival's performances, as was her son, George, and his wife, the Countess of Harewood, née Marion Stein, a former concert pianist. George was a noted music critic whose career included the role of artistic director of the Leeds Triennial Musical Festival.

In 1931, she was appointed patron of the Yorkshire Ladies Council of Education. She was also patron of the Girls' Patriotic Union of Day Schools.

It was reported in July 1927, that at a garden party at the Headingley Cricket Ground, the Princess was served tea with members of the Middleton family, which numbers among its later members Catherine, Princess of Wales, with those present including her great-grandmother, Olive Middleton. The Princess and her son, George Lascelles, 7th Earl of Harewood, were patrons of the Yorkshire Symphony Orchestra which had played at  soirées  at their home, Harewood House. Attending these concerts was  the orchestra's co-founder, Richard Noël Middleton, who was on friendly terms  with the Princess. Middleton's wife, Olive,  was a member of the Princess's fundraising committee for the Leeds General Infirmary.  Olive's first cousin was fellow committee member Elinor G. Lupton who  reportedly launched the  fund-raising appeal in 1933. The committee's Vice-Presidents included the Princess's sister-in-law, the Hon. Mrs Edward Lascelles, who served alongside  Olive Middleton and her relative, Jessie Beatrice Kitson. Princess Mary became patron of the Leeds Infirmary in 1936.

Marriage and family

On 28 February 1922, Princess Mary married Viscount Lascelles, the elder son of Henry Lascelles, 5th Earl of Harewood, and Lady Florence Bridgeman, daughter of Orlando Bridgeman, 3rd Earl of Bradford of Weston Park. The bride was 24 years old, while the groom was 39.

Their wedding was held at Westminster Abbey, and attracted large crowds along the route to Buckingham Palace. The wedding was reported by Pathé News, including the appearance of the couple on the palace balcony. The ceremony was the first royal wedding to be covered in fashion magazines, including Vogue. Her wedding dress was created by Messrs Raville and combined "youthful simplicity with royal splendour". It was designed to reflect "Britain's position as ruler of a vast empire; emblematic lotus-flower motifs embroidered in India featured alongside a domestic, yet equally symbolic, trellis work of roses in pearls and crystal beads." The Princess refused to share details of her honeymoon with the press. It was the first royal occasion in which Lady Elizabeth Bowes-Lyon, a friend of Princess Mary, participated, as one of the bridesmaids. She later married Mary's brother, Prince Albert, and became queen consort of the United Kingdom upon his accession in 1936.

The bride's attendants were:
 Lady Elizabeth Bowes-Lyon (later Queen Elizabeth The Queen Mother)
 Princess Maud, daughter of Louise, Princess Royal, and the bride's paternal first cousin
 Lady Mary Cambridge, daughter of Adolphus Cambridge, 1st Marquess of Cambridge, and the bride's maternal first cousin
 Lady May Cambridge, daughter of Alexander Cambridge, 1st Earl of Athlone, and Princess Alice of Albany and the bride's maternal first cousin and paternal second cousin
 Lady Diana Bridgeman, daughter of Orlando Bridgeman, 5th Earl of Bradford
 Lady Mary Thynne, daughter of Thomas Thynne, 5th Marquess of Bath
 Lady Rachel Cavendish, daughter of Victor Cavendish, 9th Duke of Devonshire
 Lady Doris Gordon-Lennox, daughter of Charles Gordon-Lennox, 8th Duke of Richmond.

Princess Mary and Lord Lascelles had two sons:
 George Lascelles, 7th Earl of Harewood (7 February 1923 – 11 July 2011); married, 1949, Marion Stein; had issue; divorced 1967; married, 1967, Patricia Elizabeth Tuckwell; had issue.
 The Honourable Gerald Lascelles (21 August 1924 – 27 February 1998); married, 1952, Angela Dowding; had issue; divorced 1978; married Elizabeth Collingwood; had issue.

Family homes and interests
The Princess and her husband had homes in London (Chesterfield House, Westminster) and in Yorkshire (first Goldsborough Hall, and later Harewood House). While at Goldsborough Hall, Princess Mary had internal alterations made by the architect Sydney Kitson, to suit the upbringing of her two children and instigated the development of formal planting of beech-hedge-lined long borders from the south terrace looking for a quarter of a mile down an avenue of lime trees. The limes were planted by her relatives as they visited the Hall throughout the 1920s, including her father, King George, and mother, Queen Mary.

After becoming the Countess of Harewood upon the death of her father-in-law, Princess Mary moved to Harewood House, and took a keen interest in the interior decoration and renovation of the Lascelles family seat. In farming pursuits, Princess Mary also became an expert in cattle breeding and was on the board of trustees of the Royal Agricultural Society of England of which her husband had been president. In December 2012, some of the Princess's belongings were sold in "Harewood: Collecting in the Royal Tradition", an auction organised by Christie's. The couple regularly rode with the Bramham Moor Hunt.

Princess Royal
On 6 October 1929, Lord Lascelles, who had been created a Knight of the Garter upon his marriage, succeeded his father as 6th Earl of Harewood, Viscount Lascelles, and Baron Harewood. On 1 January 1932, George V declared that his only daughter should bear the title Princess Royal, succeeding her aunt Princess Louise, Duchess of Fife who had died a year earlier.

The Princess Royal was particularly close to her eldest brother, the Prince of Wales, known as David to his close family, who subsequently became Edward VIII upon the death of their father in 1936. After the abdication crisis, she and her husband went to stay with the former Edward VIII, by then created Duke of Windsor, at Enzesfeld Castle near Vienna. Later, in November 1947, she allegedly declined to attend the wedding of her niece, Princess Elizabeth, to Lieutenant Philip Mountbatten as the Duke of Windsor had not been invited. She gave ill health as the official reason for her non-attendance. In March 1953, she cut short her tour of the West Indies and before returning to London, made a surprise diversion to New York, where she met with the Duke and Duchess of Windsor. She posed for photographs with them before she and the duke boarded the ship they travelled on to visit their ailing mother, Queen Mary.

At the outbreak of World War II, the Princess Royal became chief controller and later controller commandant of the Auxiliary Territorial Service, renamed the Women's Royal Army Corps in 1949. In that capacity, she travelled across the country, visiting its units, as well as wartime canteens and other welfare organisations. After the death in 1942 of her younger brother, the Duke of Kent, she became the president of Papworth Hospital. The Princess Royal became air chief commandant of Princess Mary's Royal Air Force Nursing Service in 1950, and received the honorary rank of general in the British Army in 1956. Also, in 1949, the 10th Gurkha Rifles were renamed the 10th Princess Mary's Own Gurkha Rifles in her honour.

After her husband's death in 1947, the Princess Royal lived at Harewood House with her elder son and his family. She became the chancellor of the University of Leeds in 1951, and continued to carry out official duties at home and abroad. She attended the coronation of Queen Elizabeth II in June 1953, and later represented the Queen at the independence celebrations of Trinidad and Tobago in 1962, and Zambia in 1964. One of her last official engagements was to represent the Queen at the funeral of Queen Louise of Sweden in early March 1965. The Princess Royal visited her brother, the Duke of Windsor, at the London Clinic in March 1965, while he recovered from recent eye surgery. The Princess also met his wife, the Duchess of Windsor, one of the Duchess's few meetings with her husband's immediate family to take place.

Death and legacy
On 28 March 1965, the Princess Royal suffered a fatal heart attack during a walk with her elder son, Lord Harewood, and his children in the grounds of the Harewood House estate. Mary was 67 years old. She was buried next to her husband in the Lascelles family vault at All Saints' Church, Harewood, after a private family funeral at York Minster. A memorial service was held at Westminster Abbey, London. Her will was sealed in London after her death with her estate valued at £347,626 (or £4.7 million in 2022 when adjusted for inflation).

Six British monarchs reigned during Princess Mary's lifetime: Victoria (her great-grandmother), Edward VII (her grandfather), George V (her father), Edward VIII and George VI (her brothers) and Elizabeth II (her niece). She is typically remembered as an uncontroversial figure of the royal family. The Princess was portrayed by Kate Phillips in Downton Abbey (2019).

During the British Mandate of Palestine, a major street in Jerusalem next to the Old City was called Princess Mary Street. After the creation of Israel, the street name was changed to "Queen Shlomzion Street", to commemorate the Jewish queen.

Honours
British
 CI: Companion of the Crown of India, 25 April 1919
 GCStJ: Dame Grand Cross of St John of Jerusalem, 12 May 1926
 GBE: Dame Grand Cross of the Order of the British Empire, 3 June 1927
 GCVO: Dame Grand Cross of the Royal Victorian Order, 11 May 1937
 TD: Territorial Decoration, 1951
 RRC: Member (First Class) of the Royal Red Cross, 1953
 CD: Canadian Forces Decoration
 Royal Family Order of Edward VII
 Royal Family Order of King George V
 Royal Family Order of King George VI
 Royal Family Order of Queen Elizabeth II

Foreign
 : Dame of the Order of Queen Maria Luisa, 12 July 1926

Namesakes
 LMS Princess Royal Class

Freedom of the City
 1952: Freeman of the City of York

Honorary military appointments 
Australian
 1937–1965: Colonel-in-Chief, of the Royal Australian Corps of Signals

British
 1918: Colonel-in-Chief, of The Royal Scots (the Royal Regiment)
 1935: Colonel-in-Chief, of the Royal Signal Corps
 1947: Colonel-in-Chief, of the West Yorkshire Regiment
 1958: amalgamated, with the East Yorkshire Regiment (The Duke of York's Own), to form the Prince of Wales' Own Yorkshire Regiment
 1950: Air Chief Commandant of Princess Mary's Royal Air Force Nursing Service

Canadian
 1930–1965: Colonel-in-Chief, of the Canadian Scottish Regiment (Princess Mary's)
 1940–1965: Colonel-in-Chief, of the Royal Canadian Corps of Signals
 1963–1965: Colonel-in-Chief, of the Royal Newfoundland Regiment

New Zealand
 1940–1965: Colonel-in-Chief, of the Royal New Zealand Corps of Signals

India
 1936–1950: Colonel-in-Chief, of the Indian Corps of Signals

Arms
In 1931, Princess Mary, Princess Royal and Countess of Harewood, was awarded her own personal arms, being the royal arms, differenced by a label argent of three points, each bearing a cross gules.

Ancestry

Notes and sources

External links

1897 births
1965 deaths
19th-century British people
19th-century British women
20th-century British people
20th-century British women
Auxiliary Territorial Service officers
British countesses
British people of German descent
British princesses
Children of George V
Companions of the Order of the Crown of India
Dames Grand Cross of the Order of St John
Dames Grand Cross of the Order of the British Empire
Dames Grand Cross of the Royal Victorian Order
Daughters of emperors
Daughters of kings
Double dames
Female army generals
Girlguiding
Mary, Countess of Harewood
Mary
Members of the Royal Red Cross
Military personnel from Norfolk
Nurses from London
People associated with the University of Leeds
People from Sandringham, Norfolk
Princess Mary's Royal Air Force Nursing Service officers
Princesses Royal
Recipients of the Silver Fish Award
Royal Air Force air marshals
Women's Royal Army Corps officers
Wives of knights